Bob and Mary is a 1923 German silent film directed by Max Glass and starring Helga Molander, Anton Edthofer, and Paul Biensfeldt.

The film's art direction was by Robert Neppach.

Cast

References

Bibliography

External links

1923 films
Films of the Weimar Republic
Films directed by Max Glass
German silent feature films
German black-and-white films
Films set in London
Terra Film films